Stone Manse is a historic manse located near Caldwell, Greenbrier County, West Virginia. It was built in 1796, and is a -story, gable roofed, Federal style dwelling. It was built using brown, red, and gray stones from the nearby Greenbrier River. A wood-frame addition was completed in 1833.  The house served as the first manse of the Old Stone Presbyterian Church in Lewisburg and was originally the home of Reverend Benjamin Porter Grigsby, the congregation's second minister.

It was listed on the National Register of Historic Places in 2004.

References

Federal architecture in West Virginia
Houses completed in 1796
Houses in Greenbrier County, West Virginia
Houses on the National Register of Historic Places in West Virginia
National Register of Historic Places in Greenbrier County, West Virginia
Stone houses in West Virginia
1796 establishments in Virginia